Fabian Sanchez is a professional dancer born in New York City, New York, who grew up in Colombia. He currently resides in Chelsea, Alabama. Fabian was the 2006 Mambo world champion.

Dancing with the Stars
Sanchez joined as a pro dancer on ABC's hit Dancing with the Stars, Season 6 and was paired with Oscar winner and deaf actress Marlee Matlin. He and his wife are owners of a Fred Astaire Dance Studios franchise in Birmingham, Alabama. Fabian will be the new Salsa/Mambo choreographer for SYTYCD season 7

Performances
With celebrity partner Marlee Matlin:

References

American ballroom dancers
Living people
Participants in American reality television series
American male dancers
Place of birth missing (living people)
Year of birth missing (living people)